Zlatá Olešnice may refer to several municipalities in the Czech Republic:

Zlatá Olešnice (Jablonec nad Nisou District)
Zlatá Olešnice (Trutnov District)